Siena Saints basketball may refer to either of the basketball teams that represent Siena College:

Siena Saints men's basketball
Siena Saints women's basketball